Wanpingcheng station is a station under construction on Line 16 of the Beijing Subway.

History 
Line 14 was supposed to come to Wanpingcheng area, but in 2008, the line was rerouted, so the residents of Wanpingcheng area signed a petition for Line 14 to come to Wanpingcheng. Due to engineering constraints, Line 14 was not able to have a station in Wanpingcheng. The closest station is Dawayao station.

In 2010, it was planned that the southern terminus for Line 16 would be Lugouqiao Xiaoyueyuan, but the plan was later changed and the line would terminate at Yushuzhuang station. Because of this, residents of Xiaoyueyuan petitioned for the line to terminate at Xiaoyueyuan, but it is unknown whether the plan was reinstated. In May 2011, the plan was changed, and the line was extended to Wanpingcheng.

On April 25, 2013, the design plan for Wanpingcheng station was published, and construction started in December 2013. The station will open in 2023.

Station Layout 
The station has an underground island platform.

References 

Railway stations under construction in China
Beijing Subway stations in Fengtai District